The discography of American rock band Butthole Surfers consists of eight studio albums, four extended plays (EP), two live albums, three compilation albums, one video album, and eight singles. Formed by Gibby Haynes and Paul Leary in San Antonio, Texas, the group signed with the Alternative Tentacles label in 1981. Butthole Surfers' eponymous debut EP was released two years later. The band added drummers King Coffey and Teresa Nervosa in 1983, moved to the Touch and Go label the following year, and released their debut full-length album, Psychic... Powerless... Another Man's Sac.

Albums

Studio albums

Live albums

Compilation albums

Video albums

Extended plays

Singles

Compilation and soundtrack contributions

Music videos

References

Discography
Discographies of American artists
Rock music group discographies